Olivetol, also known as 5-pentylresorcinol or 5-pentyl-1,3-benzenediol, is an organic compound found in certain species of lichen; it is also a precursor in various syntheses of tetrahydrocannabinol.

Occurrence 
Olivetol is a naturally occurring organic compound. It is found in certain species of lichens and can be readily extracted.

Olivetol is also produced by a number of insects, either as a pheromone, repellent, or antiseptic.

The cannabis plant internally produces the related substance olivetolic acid (OLA), which may be involved in the biosynthesis of tetrahydrocannabinol (THC).

Synthesis of THC analogs
Olivetol is used in various methods to produce synthetic analogs of THC.  One such method is a condensation reaction of olivetol and pulegone. In PiHKAL, Alexander Shulgin reports a cruder method of producing the same product by bringing to reaction olivetol and the essential oil of orange in the presence of phosphoryl chloride.

A method for the synthesis of THC itself consists of the condensation reaction between olivetol and Δ2-carene oxide.

Legality
The production, possession, and/or distribution of olivetol is not outlawed by any country; however, in the United States, it is a DEA watched precursor.

Biosynthesis
Olivetol is biosynthesized by a polyketide synthase (PKS)-type reaction from hexanoyl-CoA and three molecules of malonyl-CoA by an aldol condensation of a tetraketide intermediate. In 2009, Taura et al. was able to clone a  type III PKS named olivetol synthase (OLS) from Cannabis sativa.  This PKS is a homodimeric protein that consists of a 385 amino acid polypeptide with a molecular mass of 42,585 Da that has high sequence similarity (60-70%) identity to plant PKS's.

The data from Taura's study of OLS's enzyme kinetics show that OLS catalyzes a decarboxylative-aldol condensation to produce olivetol. This is similar to stilbene synthase's (STS) mechanism for converting p-coumaroyl-CoA and malonyl-CoA to resveratrol. Although olivetol is the decarboxylated form of OLA, it is highly unlikely that OLS produces olivetol from OLA.  Crude enzyme extracts prepared from flowers and leaves did not synthesize olivetolic acid, but only yielded olivetol. The exact mechanism of olivetol biosynthesis is as yet unsure, but it is possible that an OLA-forming metabolic complex forms along with OLS. In addition, it also appears that OLS only specifically accepts starter CoA esters with C4 to C8 aliphatic side chains such as hexanoyl-CoA.

References 

Tetrahydrocannabinol
Alkylresorcinols